The Prison Mindfulness Institute (previously the Prison Dharma Network) is a non-profit organization founded in 1989 with the mission of supporting prisoners and prison volunteers in transformation through meditation and contemplative spirituality in prisons. The organization provides books and resources through their "Books Behind Bars" program, publishes books on prison dharma through their Prison Dharma Press, organizes a pen pal program between prisoners and meditation volunteers, and offers an apprenticeship program for prison volunteers called "Path of Freedom". The organization supports prisoners in the study and practice of contemplative traditions as well as mindfulness awareness practices. It is an affiliate of the Buddhist Peace Fellowship  as well as the Peacemaker Community USA.

Philosophically, the organization claims to encourage restorative justice and transformative justice models over retributive justice.

The organization lists as its spiritual advisors Robert Baker Aitken Roshi, Pema Chödrön, Rabbi David Cooper, Roshi Bernie Glassman, Roshi Joan Halifax, Father Thomas Keating, Jack Kornfield, Stephen Levine, John Daido Loori, Sakyong Mipham Rinpoche, Thrangu Rinpoche, and Jon Kabat-Zinn.

History 
The organization was founded by Fleet Maull in 1989 when he was serving a 14-year sentence for drug trafficking. He had spent significant time studying and practicing meditation in the tradition of Chögyam Trungpa Rinpoche. He also completed a master's degree in psychology at Naropa University before his conviction and then incarceration in 1985. While in prison he completed his ngöndro by cleaning out a small prison closet to do prostrations, received Vajrayogini initiation from Thrangu Rinpoche who visited the prison.

He also pursued a Ph.D. in Psychology and began a prison hospice program for prisoners with AIDS. The program formally incorporated in 1991 as the National Prison Hospice Association and became an authorized training program for hospice. While conducting the hospice program, he served time at the U.S. Medical Center for Federal Prisoners (MCFP) in Springfield, Missouri, the hospital for federal prisoners. He was released in May 1999. He was also ordained as a priest and Zen teacher in the Zen Peacemakers Sangha of Bernie Glassman.

Prison Dharma Network has been run since 1999 by Executive Director Kate Crisp.

See also
 Richard Geller
 The Dhamma Brothers

Further reading

References

External links 
 Organization's web site
 Organization's social network

Religious prison-related organizations
Buddhist meditation
Mindfulness movement
Religious organizations established in 1989